Michael Bruce St John Maxwell (born 1971) is an Anglican bishop, who since 2019 has been the Bishop of Barbados.

Maxwell was previously Rector of Holy Trinity Church and a member of the Senate of Barbados.

References

1971 births
Living people
Barbadian Anglicans
21st-century Anglican bishops in the Caribbean
Anglican bishops of Barbados